Andriy Demchuk (born 11 December 1974) is a Ukrainian weightlifter. He competed in the men's middle heavyweight event at the 2000 Summer Olympics.

References

External links
 

1974 births
Living people
Ukrainian male weightlifters
Olympic weightlifters of Ukraine
Weightlifters at the 2000 Summer Olympics
Sportspeople from Rivne